Robert Thach (November 9, 1866 – December 20, 1924) was an American golfer. He competed in the men's individual event at the 1904 Summer Olympics.

References

1866 births
1924 deaths
American male golfers
Amateur golfers
Olympic golfers of the United States
Golfers at the 1904 Summer Olympics
Golfers from Alabama
People from Athens, Alabama